Sibert is a coal town and rail depot, and was a post office, in Clay County, Kentucky, United States located below the mouth of the Paw Paw Branch of the Horse Creek tributary of the Goose Creek river, half a mile above Hima.
The town, depot, and postoffice were all named after a local family who were descendants, through William and Milton Siebert, of pioneers Daniel and Sarah (Sallie) Siebert.

The post office was established by Ellen Lewis on 1920-09-20, James W. McNamara its first postmaster, and closed in 1974.

The elevation of Sibert is 876 feet.
Its population in July 2007 is 3,027.

Cross-reference

Sources

 

Unincorporated communities in Clay County, Kentucky
Unincorporated communities in Kentucky
Coal towns in Kentucky